Frank Davies (27 November 1907 – 8 February 1993) was an  Australian rules footballer who played with South Melbourne in the Victorian Football League (VFL).

A centreman, he was recruited from City in the Northern Tasmanian Football Association. The collection of players recruited from interstate in 1932/1933 became known as South Melbourne's "Foreign Legion".

He was playing for Launceston in 1941. He was appointed playing coach of Deloraine in 1948.

Notes

External links 

1907 births
1993 deaths
Australian rules footballers from Victoria (Australia)
Sydney Swans players
South Ballarat Football Club players